Voice recognition can refer to:
 speaker recognition, determining who is speaking
 speech recognition, determining what is being said.